Convextrocerus is an African genus of potter wasps with two described species.

References

Potter wasps